Potok is a village in Gabrovo Municipality, in Gabrovo Province, in northern central Bulgaria. In 2020 it had a population of 3.

References

Villages in Gabrovo Province